Parvilacerta is a genus of wall lizards of the family Lacertidae.

Species
Parvilacerta fraasii  — Fraas's lizard
Parvilacerta parva  — dwarf lizard

References

 
Lizard genera
Taxa named by David James Harris
Taxa named by Edwin Nicholas Arnold
Taxa named by Richard Thomas (herpetologist)